The Alberca Olímpica Francisco Márquez is an indoor swimming pool Olympic facility located in Mexico City, Mexico. It has a capacity of 4,300.

It hosted the 1968 Summer Olympics for competitions of swimming, diving, water polo, and the swimming part of modern pentathlon. The only Mexican gold medal in Olympic swimming competitions was won at this site. It was won by Felipe Muñoz in the 200 metres men breast stroke competition.

It also hosted the 2017 World Para Swimming Championships.

References
1968 Summer Olympics official report. Volume 2. Part 1. p. 72.

Sports venues in Mexico City
Venues of the 1968 Summer Olympics
Olympic diving venues
Olympic modern pentathlon venues
Olympic swimming venues
Olympic water polo venues